Mount Goode is a 13,085-foot-elevation (3,988 meter) mountain summit located on the crest of the Sierra Nevada mountain range in California, United States. It is situated on the shared boundary of Kings Canyon National Park with John Muir Wilderness, and along the common border of Fresno County with Inyo County. 

History
This mountain's name and location were officially adopted in 1926 by the U.S. Board on Geographic Names based on a recommendation by the Sierra Club. Prior to 1926, the USGS placed Mount Goode at the location of Black Giant. The name commemorates Richard Urquhart Goode (1858–1903), geographer for the United States Geological Survey, in charge of the Pacific Division, Topographic Branch. The first ascent of the peak was made July 16, 1939, by Chester Versteeg, a prominent Sierra Club member.

Climbing
Established rock climbing routes on Mount Goode:

Climate
According to the Köppen climate classification system, Mount Goode is located in an alpine climate zone. Most weather fronts originate in the Pacific Ocean, and travel east toward the Sierra Nevada mountains. As fronts approach, they are forced upward by the peaks, causing them to drop their moisture in the form of rain or snowfall onto the range (orographic lift). Precipitation runoff from this mountain drains west into the Kings River, and east to Owens River via Bishop Creek.

Gallery

See also
 Mount Goode (Alaska)
 Goode Mountain (Washington)

References

External links
 Weather forecast: Mount Goode
 Mt. Goode photo: Flickr

Inyo National Forest
Mountains of Inyo County, California
Mountains of Fresno County, California
Mountains of Kings Canyon National Park
Mountains of the John Muir Wilderness
North American 3000 m summits
Mountains of Northern California
Sierra Nevada (United States)